The Holland Performing Arts Center is a performing arts facility located on 13th and Douglas Streets in downtown Downtown Omaha, Nebraska in the United States; it opened in October 2005. Designed by Omaha architectural firm HDR, Inc. in collaboration with Polshek Partnership Architects, the structure is owned and managed by Omaha Performing Arts, and specializes in events requiring an environment with good acoustics, including performances by touring jazz, blues and popular entertainers, as well as the Omaha Symphony Orchestra and Omaha Area Youth Orchestra.  Kirkegaard Associates provided acoustics consulting and New York firm Fisher Dachs Associates provided theater planning and design consultation.

Performance and other facilities
The Center includes several performance areas.  The Peter Kiewit Concert Hall seats 2,005 and has a stage size of 64 feet by 48 feet; it is modeled after European "shoebox" shaped halls.  The Suzanne and Walter Scott Recital Hall is a "black box" space with seating for 486 people and a stage size of 40 feet by 32 feet.  The Courtyard is a semi-closed area for events, with a capacity of 1,000 people.

See also
The Orpheum
List of concert halls

External links 
Omaha Performing Arts Society
Ticket Omaha

2005 establishments in Nebraska
Theatres in Omaha, Nebraska
Music venues in Omaha, Nebraska
Performing arts centers in Nebraska